OMSI/Southeast Water station is a light rail station on the MAX Orange Line, located at 2210 Southeast 2nd Place on the east foot of the Tilikum Crossing bridge in Portland, Oregon. Like South Waterfront/SW Moody Station on the west side of the Willamette River, it consists of two island platforms. MAX trains stop on the outside of the platforms, while TriMet buses stop on the inner lanes. Just northwest of the platforms is a Portland Streetcar stop served by the A and B Loop lines. The station is named after the nearby Oregon Museum of Science and Industry.

The station is located adjacent to the Oregon Rail Heritage Center.

Bus service 
, this station is served by the following bus lines:
FX2–Division
9–Powell Blvd
17–Holgate/Broadway

Gallery

References 

2015 establishments in Oregon
MAX Light Rail stations
MAX Orange Line
Railway stations in Portland, Oregon
Railway stations in the United States opened in 2015
Southeast Portland, Oregon